Yunaika Crawford Rogert (born November 2, 1982 in Marianao, Ciudad de la Habana) is a Cuban hammer thrower who won the Olympic bronze medal in 2004 with a personal best throw of 73.16 metres.

Early career
Crawford made an early debut on the international stage. At the age of sixteen, she competed at the 1998 World Junior Championships, finishing ninth. She had set a season's best throw of 57.03 metres in the qualifying round. The next year she won the silver medal at the inaugural World Youth Championships, for athletes aged seventeen and less. She threw 57.56 metres to win that medal, but had managed a personal best of 62.71 metres in Havana in March. One year after that, in March 2000, she improved to 65.88 metres in Las Tunas. The 2000 World Junior Championships were staged in Santiago de Chile, with Crawford winning the bronze medal. It was the second championships that included the women's hammer throw.

In her last season as a junior, Crawford won the Pan American Junior Championships. She did so in a new championship record of 63.20 metres, and her season's best was 65.67 m, from Santiago de Cuba in July. She also won the 2001 Central American and Caribbean Championships, again in a championship record, this time 58.68 metres.

Senior career
In 2002 Crawford broke the 70-metre barrier for the first time, with 70.62 metres achieved during a meet in Madrid in July. She improved slightly the next year, with 70.69 from Havana in May. She won the silver medal at the 2003 Pan American Games, behind countryfellow Yipsi Moreno. She also competed at the 2003 World Championships, but with a 64.59 throw in the qualifying round, she did not reach the top twelve, who progressed to the final.

In 2004, Crawford beat her 2003 best result several times. Having started the season with a couple of competitions in the 60-metre range, she launched a 71.62 metre throw in Havana in March. She then dropped below 70 metres in the next competition, before returning with a 70.44 m throw in Seville, 71.75 in Guadalajara, 71.40 in Padova and 70.33 in Kazan. Entering the Olympic Games, she threw 71.74 metres in the qualifying round and progressed safely to the final. Here, she reached new levels to throw a career best of 73.16 metres. This was enough to win the Olympic bronze medal. Ahead of her on the podium were Russian Olga Kuzenkova, who had started with a 73.18 metre throw and been leading throughout the competition, and pre-event favourite Yipsi Moreno who had to settle for silver.

In 2005, she only managed a season's best of 69.30 metres, from Havana in March. She competed at the 2005 World Championships, but fell through in the qualification round. With only 63.79 metres she was far from securing a place in the final round. She did however win the silver medal at the 2005 Central American and Caribbean Championships, this time behind Trinidadian Candice Scott. The next year her season's best throw was 71.92 metres. However, no major events were staged this year, except for the 2006 Central American and Caribbean Games, where she won another silver medal behind Yipsi Moreno.

In 2007, she managed to reach an international final again, at the 2007 World Championships, but in the final round she finished twelfth and last following two throws in the 67-metre range. She then competed at the 2008 Olympic Games, but did not reach the final round and finishing with a 31st place.

Personal best
Hammer throw: 73.16 m –  Beijing, 25 August 2004

Achievements

References

External links
 
 
 Tilastopaja biography 
 Ecured biography (in Spanish)

1982 births
Living people
Cuban female hammer throwers
Athletes (track and field) at the 2003 Pan American Games
Athletes (track and field) at the 2004 Summer Olympics
Athletes (track and field) at the 2008 Summer Olympics
Olympic athletes of Cuba
Olympic bronze medalists for Cuba
Medalists at the 2004 Summer Olympics
Pan American Games silver medalists for Cuba
Olympic bronze medalists in athletics (track and field)
Pan American Games medalists in athletics (track and field)
Medalists at the 2003 Pan American Games
Central American and Caribbean Games medalists in athletics
Athletes from Havana